Maurice Sanglard (19 August 1927 – April 1963) was a French alpine skier. He competed in three events at the 1952 Winter Olympics.

References

1927 births
1963 deaths
French male alpine skiers
Olympic alpine skiers of France
Alpine skiers at the 1952 Winter Olympics
People from Chamonix
Sportspeople from Haute-Savoie